The Grigio Siciliano or , is a breed of donkey from the Mediterranean island of Sicily in southern Italy. It is bred only on the island,  in the provinces of Agrigento, Enna, Palermo, Ragusa and Syracuse. The conservation status of the Grigio Siciliano was listed as "critical" by the FAO in 2007. In 2012 it was not among the autochthonous donkey breeds of limited distribution recognised by the Ministero delle Politiche Agricole Alimentari e Forestali, the Italian ministry of agriculture and forestry. A recent census conducted by researchers at the University of Messina counted approximately 100 individuals between 4 months and 14 years old.

References

Donkey breeds originating in Italy
Sicily
Donkey breeds